Corso Italia is an infill station currently under construction on the Trillium Line in Ottawa, Ontario. It will service Ottawa's Little Italy neighbourhood. It is being constructed as part of the Stage 2 O-Train expansion and is scheduled for completion in 2023. The station will consist of two side platforms and is located north of Gladstone Avenue, near Preston Street. The station was known as Gladstone during development.

References

Trillium Line stations
Railway stations scheduled to open in 2023